Pixie Hollow Bake Off is a six-minute short, based on the Disney Fairies franchise, produced by DisneyToon Studios. It aired in the United Kingdom on October 20, 2013, on Disney Channel. It is based loosely on J. M. Barrie's Peter Pan stories, by way of Disney's animated adaptation.

Plot
Tink challenges Gelata (Lisa Faulkner in the UK version and by Giada De Laurentiis in the US version) to see who can bake the best cake for the queen's party. There are a group of baking fairies, the main one being Gelata. The baking fairies always make exactly the same cake for Queen Clarion's Arrival Day party, for the last 399 years.

Tinker Bell has an idea for a different kind of cake, which Gelata takes as a challenge... hence, the bake off. Tink and her friends compete against the baking fairies. In the end, Tink's cake looks very appealing, but finds out looks aren't everything.

Cast
 Mae Whitman as Tinker Bell
 Giada De Laurentis as Gelata (US Version)
 Lisa Faulkner as Gelata (UK Version)
 Lucy Liu as Silvermist
 Raven-Symoné as Iridessa
 Megan Hilty as Rosetta
 Pamela Adlon as Vidia
 Angela Bartys as Fawn
 Jeff Bennett as Clank / Fairy Gary
 Rob Paulsen as Bobble
 Jane Horrocks as Fairy Mary
 Anjelica Huston as Queen Clarion

Release
The special debuted in the United Kingdom on The Disney Channel on October 20, 2013. It was later featured as an exclusive bonus disc accompanying the Blu-ray release of The Pirate Fairy in 2014, which included 10 extra mini-shorts of around 1–2 minutes. The special was released widely through Disney Movies Anywhere.

References

External links

 
 

Tinker Bell (film series)
DisneyToon Studios animated films
Films set in Italy
American children's films
2013 television specials
2013 films
2010s American films